Bankawan Island is an island located on Kudat district in Sabah, Malaysia.

See also
 List of islands of Malaysia

External links 
 Pulau Bankawan on geoview.info
 Pulau Bankawan on getamap.net

Islands of Sabah